is a 2011 Japanese film. It is based on the novel Hankyū Densha by Hiro Arikawa and directed by Yoshishige Miyake. It was released in cinemas in the Kansai region of Japan on April 23, 2011, and then in other regions of the country from April 29.

The stage for the story is the commuter railway Hankyū Imazu Line in Hyōgo Prefecture, Japan.

Cast
 Miki Nakatani as Shoko Takase, an office lady in her 30s. She was engaged to her boyfriend when she entered the company, but he was stolen away by a younger co-worker.
 Erika Toda as Misa Morioka, a college student with a good-for-nothing boyfriend.
 Kaho Minami as Yasue Ito
 Tetsuji Tamayama as Ryuta Toyama
 Nobuko Miyamoto as Tokie Hagiwara, a traditional old woman and the grandmother of Ami. The young Tokie was played by Mei Kurokawa.
 Kasumi Arimura as Etsuko Kadota
 Mana Ashida as Ami Hagiwara, Tokie's suffering granddaughter. Ashida was selected for this role because she is from Nishinomiya, Hyogo, and is able to speak naturally in the Kansai dialect.
 Mikahoa Mina as a housewife who is part of a circle of women who have a rich husband.
 Ryo Katsuji as Keiichi Kosaka
 Yū Koyanagi as Katsuya
 Suzuka Morita as Etsuko's friend		
 Mitsuki Tanimura as Miho Gondawara
 Saki Aibu as Mayumi
 Tsutomu Takahashi	as Kengo

Film festival
This film was featured in the 3rd Okinawa International Movie Festival in the "Peace" category.

References

External links
 
 

Films based on Japanese novels
Films directed by Yoshishige Miyake
Films with screenplays by Yoshikazu Okada
2010s Japanese films

ja:阪急電車 (小説)#映画